Alexandre Gemignani (June 26, 1925 – March 8, 1998) was a Brazilian basketball player who competed in the 1948 Summer Olympics. There he won the bronze medal with the national team under the guidance of head coach Moacyr Daiuto. He was born in São Paulo.

References

External links
Alexandre Gemignani's profile at databaseOlympics
 Biography of Alexandre Gemignani

1925 births
1998 deaths
Basketball players from São Paulo
Brazilian men's basketball players
Olympic basketball players of Brazil
Basketball players at the 1948 Summer Olympics
Olympic bronze medalists for Brazil
Olympic medalists in basketball
Medalists at the 1948 Summer Olympics
1950 FIBA World Championship players
20th-century Brazilian people